The Jive Aces are a six-piece UK-based, swing band that was formed in 1989. They were Britain's Got Talent semi-finalists in 2012. They have released 11 albums, as well as compilations, EPs and singles and have performed at numerous music festivals.

The band was founded by vocalist Ian Clarkson, drummer Peter Howell (who went to school with Ian in Billericay), bassist Ken Smith and saxophonist "Big" John Fordham. The four met in East London jive and jazz clubs. They cut their teeth street entertaining and were soon being offered shows in UK and Europe. After several years of touring the band with various other musicians, the four met Alex Douglas (trombone, bongos, blues harp, washboard) and Vince Hurley (piano) who became permanent members. Grazia Clarkson, the band's publicist, has also become a regular performing member playing several featured songs on accordion.

The band is recognized as one of the top swing bands in the world, something borne out by their extensive international travel (the band has performed in over 40 countries). The June 2015 issue of Vintage Rock magazine described them as the "UK's number one jive and swing band".

They have received awards from Variety, the Children's Charity and the City of Derry International Music Award in 2006. On 12 September 2018 The Jive Aces won "Best Band" at the Boisdale Music Awards. The award was presented by Jools Holland, who then joined the band for a boogie woogie jam session.

The band is also notable for having strong links to the Church of Scientology as members of the Sea Organization, and for promoting the religion and its missions. Some critics of the Church of Scientology claim that The Jive Aces are used as a front group for Scientology; Mike Rinder, former senior executive of the Church of Scientology International and the Sea Organization, claims that the band is used for generating "positive PR" for the church.

Career

Notable highlights
On 9 July 2010, the band headlined at the first ever swing dance at the Royal Albert Hall. They played to approximately 1,400 dancers on the  dance floor, with support from the Back To Basie Orchestra and Top Shelf Jazz.

In late August 2010, the Jive Aces performed at the Edinburgh Fringe Festival in a show tributing one of their musical heroes, Louis Prima. In February 2011, after recording in Los Angeles, they toured the United States, including opening for legendary singer Keely Smith, the former wife of Louis Prima. Keely Smith has also sung with the band on a number of occasions, including shows in Los Angeles, Palm Desert, Phoenix and at the Edinburgh Fringe.

The band played London's famous jazz venue Ronnie Scotts for the first time in July 2011 and sold out. The band has since played there several times a year, selling out every time.

In Spring 2015, the band did their biggest tour to date, 6 weeks of major theatres around the US (mostly 1000-2000+ capacity). The tour was a huge success, with biannual USA tours every year since.

On 10 February 2019, the Jive Aces brought an expanded version of their Big Beat Revue tour to London's Aldwych Theatre. This is one of London's West End theatres (the UK equivalent of Broadway). The show, featuring special guests Cassidy Janson, BBC Radio London's Jo Good, The Satin Dollz, Antonio Socci and Lottie B, was sold out and received standing ovations.

Viral video "Bring Me Sunshine"
In March 2011, the band produced a YouTube video for their cover of the Morecambe and Wise theme song "Bring Me Sunshine", in a Louis Prima, jive style. It went on to win several awards at film festivals, and a Silver Telly Award.  The video is noted for its uplifting quality and has even been prescribed by a US doctor for depression, as noted in national media. As of May 2019, the video has been viewed over 3.3 million times on YouTube.

Britain's Got Talent
In January 2012 The Jive Aces auditioned for Britain's Got Talent, with the audition airing on week 6 on 28 April 2012, performing the band's version of The Jungle Book classic, "I Wanna Be Like You". The band greatly impressed the judges, with Simon Cowell calling them "Absolutely brilliant" and adding "That really put me in a good mood!" They went on to become the first live band to get through to the live semi-finals of BGT.

Performing for HM The Queen
On 15 May 2012 the Jive Aces performed for HM the Queen & HRH Prince Philip on their visit to Bromley as part of her majesty's Diamond Jubilee celebrations. The band also performed as part of the Jubilee celebration in Hyde Park, featuring alongside other BGT acts.
In 2013 the band played 4 shows at Buckingham Palace for The Coronation Festival, the first ever public festival inside the grounds of the palace.

Glastonbury and other festivals
In May 2015 it was announced that The Jive Aces would perform on the Avalon Stage at the world-famous Glastonbury Festival. This was the band's second appearance at Glastonbury, but their first on the Avalon Stage. The band's set was considered a highlight of this year's festival and a short clip of a mid-set keyboard collapse and speedy recovery by pianist Hurley went viral with online features in the Mirror (who called Hurley "Brilliantly committed" and "a hero of Glastonbury") and Telegraph, and as far afield as Nigeria and Singapore.

The band has also appeared at numerous major festivals including Lovebox, Montreux, Hop Farm Festival, Bearded Theory, Ascona, North Sea Jazz, Jazz a Montauban, Bansko Jazz Cork Jazz, Lunel Jazz, Klaipeda Jazz, Edinburgh Fringe, Viva Las Vegas and even in Thailand.

The Jive Aces have also performed at many special events including the London Olympics at Trafalgar Square, both Conservative Party and TUC Conferences and for a crowd of 15,000 at the "Moonwalk " cancer charity fundraising walk in London.

The Jive Aces returned to Glastonbury Festival in 2017, with an appearance on the prestigious Acoustic Stage.

"The Jive Aces Big Beat Revue", The Aldwych Theatre and theatre tours
The band initially played mostly at clubs and dancehalls, but their theatricality and showmanship has also led to them performing in more and more theatres, both in UK and USA. Notable tours include "Swingtime", "Jump, Jive & Wail", "Swingin' The Holidays" and "Jazz Meets Jive" (with the late Kenny Ball).

in Spring 2019 the band launched its "Jive Aces Big Beat Revue" tour, with a sold-out show at London's Aldwych Theatre. This tour is an ongoing one starring The Jive Aces with different guest performers for each year and dates mostly in Spring of each year. 2019 had The Satin Dollz as guests and 2020 featured Kara Lane, Lottie B and Antonio Socci. This Spring 2020 tour boasted 27 dates around the UK, although some had to be postponed due to Coronavirus and are now rescheduled to late 2020 or 2021.
In September 2022 the band announced their return to The Aldwych Theatre with their "Not Quite Christmas Show".

Recordings
The band has released 11 studio albums, plus two EPs and various singles and contributions to compilation albums.

The band's 1999 album "Planet Jive", their second to be recorded in the United States, was released at the legendary Hollywood Palladium in Los Angeles with a spectacular show featuring an expanded eight piece brass section and support from Red and the Red Hots.

On 1 June 2015, the band released their ninth studio album Spread a Little Happiness, featuring the single "La Dolce Vita", "Smile", "L.O.V.E" and nine other tracks including five original songs. This album, along with all of the band's releases since 2005, was recorded at Mad Hatter Studios in Los Angeles, CA. Most of their recent recording projects have been done with Grammy winning mixer/engineers Brian Vibberts and Buck Snow.

In 2017/18 they released their tenth and eleventh studio album "Diggin' The Roots Vol 1: Rockin' Rhythm & Blues" and "Diggin' The Roots Vol 2: Hot Jazz". These  albums pay tribute to influences such as Big Joe Turner and Louis Jordan in Vol 1 and Louis Armstrong and Fats Waller in Vol 2 and have received great reviews.

Summertime Swing
The band has put on their own annual charity festival, "Summertime Swing ", in the grounds of Saint Hill Manor, East Grinstead, since 2004.

The event has grown bigger each year and now attracts over 1800 people. Over the years it has featured many well known jazz and roots performers including Keely Smith, Cassidy Janson, Kenny Ball, Acker Bilk, Laurie London, Chas McDevitt, Gunhild Carling, Gina Haley and Ray Gelato. Between 2017 and 2019 the event has raised £17,000 for charities including The Not Forgotten Association.
In 2017 it was featured as one of the Daily Telegraph's "30 nostalgic days out to try this Summer".

Collaborations
The Jive Aces have featured many guest artists on their recordings, including Chick Corea, Kenny Ball, Mark Isham, Ray Gelato, Mr Acker Bilk, Toni Elizabeth Prima, The Satin Dollz, The Flirtinis, Rebecca Grant, and The Three Belles.

In live performance the band has worked with Van Morrison, Keely Smith, John Travolta, Kenny Ball (with whom they worked extensively on the Jazz Meets Jive theatre tour 2010-12) and since 2014 have been featuring West End star and Olivier Award winner Cassidy Janson (Wicked, Avenue Q, Dessa Rose, Beautiful, etc.) as guest singer at many shows.

JiveStream
On 17 March 2020, one week prior to the Coronavirus lockdown, The Jive Aces started a one-hour daily livestream on Facebook to keep in contact with their fans while unable to perform live. This show rapidly developed from a simple iPhone broadcast early on to a fully professional set up with high quality camera with multiple cameras and regular sections of the show such as "Celebrity Call-in" (featuring the likes of Len Goodman, Kevin J McNally, Cassidy Janson, Ray Gelato and Diane Keen), "Italian Time" (featuring resident Italian Grazia with dedications and more), "Favourite Things" (asking viewers to send in their positive experiences with the lockdown) and "Competition Time". In August 2020 the band put on a special Summertime Swing edition of JiveStream, when the event itself had to be cancelled. Friends such as Cassidy Janson, Ray Gelato, Gina Haley, Gunhild Carling and Peter Donegan contributed live performances and helped raise hundreds of pounds for The Not Forgotten, one of the band's favorite charities.
The show was expected to run for three weeks, but on 16 March 2021 the Jive Aces celebrated a full year of the JiveStream after racking up 365 consecutive episodes. The show went on to run for 500 consecutive days before cutting down to a less regular basis as the band started returning to live performance. The show had fans watching from as far afield as USA, Africa, Australia and India. This was reported by a number of media including a feature on Russia Today, as well as print media

Back on the road
The band finally returned to the road, with a full USA tour in Spring 2022. The tour, which includes many sold-out show, is currently ongoing with shows in Florida, Georgia, North Carolina, Virginia, California, Arizona, Texas and Utah.

Original songs
Although the band tends to predominantly play covers in their live performances, all members of the band have written songs for the band's studio albums. Some of the best known are "La Dolce Vita", "Ukulele Swing", "Christmas Is Where You Are", "The Simple Things" (featured in hit Netflix show "Sex Education"), "Lovin' Life", "Long Distance Love Affair", "Life Is A Game" (the last three all featured in the feature film "In Search of Felinni") and "London Rhythm" (used as theme song for Jo Good's BBC Radio London show). All but one of the band's albums feature some original tunes and the concept album "Amazing Adventures" (inspired by film noir and pulp fiction of the 1940s and 1950s) is entirely self penned.

Promotion of Scientology
The band have been known to perform up to 300 times a year, often promoting Scientology or presenting an anti-drugs message. They have been noted for their "energetic" and "confident" performances, which they attribute to "workable solutions found in Scientology religious principles".

The Jive Aces have supported the Church of Scientology's Say No To Drugs campaign since 1996, performing to shoppers in city centres throughout the UK, to give a message to young people that it is "not cool to take drugs", through distribution of "Truth About Drugs" booklets written by the Church.

The self-produced materials used in these campaigns have been described as "discredited pseudoscience" and without "pharmacological basis" by health care professionals.

In April 2012, the band lent their support to the Multi-Marathon for a Drug-Free UK, a 130-mile run organised by the Church of Scientology; The First Annual Multi-Marathon for a Drug-Free United Kingdom  from London to Brighton in Crawley, West Sussex, not too far from Saint Hill Manor, a site regarded as the British headquarters of the Church.

In 2018, the band was featured in an episode of the series "Meet a Scientologist", on the network "Scientology Network". The half hour show uses vintage footage, interviews and performance clips to tell the tale of the Jive Aces rise from street entertainers to headlining at major festivals and events around the world, as well as the story behind their commitment to drug prevention.

Discography

Albums
 1992: Jumpin' with the Aces (Mumbo Jumbo)
 1996: Our Kinda Jive (JA Recordings)
 1997: Bolt from the Blue (Right Recordings)
 1998: Planet Jive (Right Recordings)
 2003: Blair Sings Astaire (with Lionel Blair) (Right Recordings)
 2005: Life Is a Game (Right Recordings)
 2008: Recipe for Rhythm (Right Recordings)
 2009: Dance All Night (Right Recordings)
 2011: Amazing Adventures (Golden Age Recordings)
 2011: It's Skiffle Time EP (Golden Age Recordings)
 2012: King of the Swingers: A Salute to Louis Prima (Golden Age Recordings) 
 2013: Christmas Is Where You Are EP (Golden Age Recordings)
 2015: Spread a Little Happiness (Golden Age Recordings)
 2016: For the Record vinyl only (Invisible Hands) 
 2017: Diggin' the Roots Vol 1: Rockin' Rhythm & Blues (Golden Age Recordings)
 2018: Diggin' the Roots Vol 2: Hot Jazz (Golden Age Recordings)
 2018: Diggin' the Roots Vol 1&2 vinyl only (Golden Age Recordings)

Singles
 2002: "White Hot Christmas" (Right Recordings)
 2006: "Singing in the Rain" (Right Recordings)
 2006: "White Cliffs of Dover" (Right Recordings)
 2011: "Bring Me Sunshine" (Golden Age Recordings)
 2018: "Music, Music, Music" (Right Recordings)

References

External links
 

Swing musicians
Jump blues musicians
British jazz ensembles
English Scientologists
Musical groups from Essex